Edmund A. Bock (September 1, 1888 – October 14, 1923) was an American politician who served as the Mayor of Salt Lake City in 1920.

References

1888 births
1923 deaths
Mayors of Salt Lake City
People from St. Clair County, Illinois